The 1924–25 Lancashire Cup competition was the seventeenth in the history of this regional rugby league competition and the cup was won by Oldham who beat the holders and last year's winners St Helens Recs in the final at The Willows, Salford, by a score of 10-0. The attendance at the final was 15,000 and receipts £1,116.

Background 
The number of teams entering the competition remained at 13 which resulted in 3 byes in the first round.

Competition and results

Round 1  
Involved  5 matches (with three byes) and 13 clubs

Round 2 – quarterfinals

Round 3 – semifinals

Final

Teams and scorers 

Scoring - Try = three (3) points - Goal = two (2) points - Drop goal = two (2) points

The road to success

See also 
1924–25 Northern Rugby Football League season

Notes

 1 The Willows was the home ground of Salford.

References

RFL Lancashire Cup
Lancashire Cup